The Tirailleurs indochinois (Chữ Nôm: 𪜯習) were soldiers of several regiments of local ethnic Indochinese infantry organized as Tirailleurs by the French colonial authorities, initially in Vietnam from 15 March 1880. The most notable, and first established, of these units were the Tonkinese Rifles (French: Tirailleurs tonkinois, Vietnamese: Quân đoàn bộ binh Bắc Kỳ).

History 

In the early days of these regiments the charge was often made that the Lính tập were prone to desertion.

However under the leadership of officers seconded from the regular French Marine (subsequently Colonial) Infantry the Lính tập became an effective corps, without which the French would have had difficulty in occupying and garrisoning their Indochinese possessions.

The Tirailleurs indochinois saw active service in Indochina, China (Boxer Rebellion), Russian Siberia (Allied intervention 1918–19), Syria (1920–21) and Morocco (1925–26). During World War I the French Army was initially reluctant to deploy its Indochinese units of the Troupes coloniales on the Western Front but eventually 40,000 Annamite and Cambodian tirailleurs were sent to France. The majority were employed behind the lines in guard, depot and factory-worker duties. However several battalions fought at Verdun, the Chemin des Dames, and in Champagne. Indochinese troops were also deployed to the Macedonian front. 
 
On 10 February 1930 fifty soldiers of the Tonkinese Rifles rose in support of the VNQDD during the Yen Bai mutiny, which was quickly suppressed by loyal tirailleurs of the same regimentbut resulted in increased recruitment of non-Vietnamese soldiers.

In 1945 some Lính tập units fought against the Japanese occupation of Vietnam. In particular the "3e RTT" (3e régiment de tirailleurs tonkinois) offered fierce resistance but was annihilated. The six Tonkinese and Annamite tirailleur regiments then in existence were destroyed or dispersed in the course of the Japanese coup, and were not reestablished. Large numbers of Vietnamese troops did however serve in the French Union Forces during the French Indochina War (1946–1954) and the last Indochinese unit in the French Army was not disbanded until 1960.

Regiments 
The regiments were founded in each of the territories of Tonkin, Annam and Cambodia.

Tirailleurs tonkinois ("Tonkinese Rifles") 

 1er régiment de tirailleurs tonkinois
 2e régiment de tirailleurs tonkinois
 3e régiment de tirailleurs tonkinois
 4e régiment de tirailleurs tonkinois
 5e régiment de tirailleurs tonkinois (1902-1908)

Tirailleurs annamites 

 1er Régiment de tirailleurs annamites
 2e Régiment de tirailleurs annamites
 Bataillon de tirailleurs montagnards du sud Annam

Tirailleurs cambodgiens 

 Bataillon de tirailleurs cambodgiens
 Régiment de tirailleurs cambodgiens

Tirailleurs Tais 

Ethnic Taï from Sip Song Chau Tai and Northern Laos.

 1er bataillon Thaï
 2e bataillon taï
 3e bataillon taï

References

Bibliography 
 
 

20th-century regiments of France
Colonial troops
French Indochina
Military history of Vietnam
Military history of Vietnam during World War I
Military history of Cambodia